Raïes Roshanali (born 30 October 1995) is a Dutch football player who last played for FC Dordrecht.

Club career
He made his professional debut in the Eerste Divisie for FC Oss on 7 August 2015 in a game against FC Emmen.

References

External links
 

1995 births
Footballers from Amsterdam
Living people
Dutch footballers
Netherlands youth international footballers
TOP Oss players
FC Dordrecht players
Eerste Divisie players
Association football midfielders